RecA is a 38 kilodalton protein essential for the repair and maintenance of DNA. A RecA structural and functional homolog has been found in every species in which one has been seriously sought and serves as an archetype for this class of homologous DNA repair proteins. The homologous protein is called RAD51 in eukaryotes and RadA in archaea.

RecA has multiple activities, all related to DNA repair. In the bacterial SOS response, it has a co-protease function in the autocatalytic cleavage of the LexA repressor and the λ repressor.

RecA's association with DNA repair is based on its central role in homologous recombination. The RecA protein binds strongly and in long clusters to ssDNA to form a nucleoprotein filament. The protein has more than one DNA binding site, and thus can hold a single strand and double strand together. This feature makes it possible to catalyze a DNA synapsis reaction between a DNA double helix and a complementary region of single-stranded DNA. The RecA-ssDNA filament searches for sequence similarity along the dsDNA. A disordered DNA loop in RecA, Loop 2, contains the residues responsible for DNA homologous recombination. In some bacteria, RecA posttranslational modification via phosphorylation of a serine residue on Loop 2 can interfere with homologous recombination.

The search process induces stretching of the DNA duplex, which enhances sequence complementarity recognition (a mechanism termed conformational proofreading). The reaction initiates the exchange of strands between two recombining DNA double helices. After the synapsis event, in the heteroduplex region a process called branch migration begins. In branch migration an unpaired region of one of the single strands displaces a paired region of the other single strand, moving the branch point without changing the total number of base pairs. Spontaneous branch migration can occur, however, as it generally proceeds equally in both directions it is unlikely to complete recombination efficiently. The RecA protein catalyzes unidirectional branch migration and by doing so makes it possible to complete recombination, producing a region of heteroduplex DNA that is thousands of base pairs long.

Since it is a DNA-dependent ATPase, RecA contains an additional site for binding and hydrolyzing ATP. RecA associates more tightly with DNA when it has ATP bound than when it has ADP bound.

In Escherichia coli, homologous recombination events mediated by RecA can occur during the period after DNA replication when sister loci remain close.  RecA can also mediate homology pairing, homologous recombination and DNA break repair between distant sister loci that had segregated to opposite halves of the E. coli cell.

E. coli strains deficient in RecA are useful for cloning procedures in molecular biology laboratories. E. coli strains are often genetically modified to contain a mutant recA allele and thereby ensure the stability of extrachromosomal segments of DNA, known as plasmids. In a process called transformation, plasmid DNA is taken up by the bacteria under a variety of conditions. Bacteria containing exogenous plasmids are called "transformants". Transformants retain the plasmid throughout cell divisions such that it can be recovered and used in other applications. Without functional RecA protein, the exogenous plasmid DNA is left unaltered by the bacteria. Purification of this plasmid from bacterial cultures can then allow high-fidelity PCR amplification of the original plasmid sequence.

Potential as a drug target
Wigle and Singleton at the University of North Carolina have shown that small molecules interfering with RecA function in the cell may be useful in the creation of new antibiotic drugs.  Since many antibiotics lead to DNA damage, and all bacteria rely on RecA to fix this damage, inhibitors of RecA could be used to enhance the toxicity of antibiotics.  Additionally the activities of RecA are synonymous with antibiotic resistance development, and inhibitors of RecA may also serve to delay or prevent the appearance of bacterial drug resistance.

Role of RecA in natural transformation
Based on analysis of the molecular properties of the RecA system, Cox concluded that the data "provide compelling evidence that the primary mission of RecA protein is DNA repair."  In a further essay on the function of the RecA protein, Cox summarized data demonstrating that "RecA protein evolved as the central component of a recombinational DNA repair system, with the generation of genetic diversity as a sometimes useful byproduct."
 
Natural bacterial transformation involves the transfer of DNA from one bacterium to another (ordinarily of the same species) and the integration of the donor DNA into the recipient chromosome by homologous recombination, a process mediated by the RecA protein (see Transformation (genetics)).  Transformation, in which RecA plays a central role, depends on expression of numerous additional gene products (e.g. about 40 gene products in Bacillus subtilis) that specifically interact to carry out this process indicating that it is an evolved adaptation for DNA transfer.  In B. subtilis the length of the transferred DNA can be as great as a third and up to the size of the whole chromosome.  In order for a bacterium to bind, take up and recombine exogenous DNA into its chromosome, it must first enter a special physiological state termed "competence" (see Natural competence).  Transformation is common in the prokaryotic world, and thus far 67 species are known to be competent for transformation.

One of the most well studied transformation systems is that of B. subtilis.  In this bacterium, the RecA protein interacts with the incoming single-stranded DNA (ssDNA) to form striking filamentous structures.  These RecA/ssDNA filaments emanate from the cell pole containing the competence machinery and extend into the cytosol.  The RecA/ssDNA filamentous threads are considered to be dynamic nucleofilaments that scan the resident chromosome for regions of homology.  This process brings the incoming DNA to the corresponding site in the B. subtilis chromosome where informational exchange occurs.

Michod et al. have reviewed evidence that RecA-mediated transformation is an adaptation for homologous recombinational repair of DNA damage in B. subtilis, as well as in several other bacterial species (i.e. Neisseria gonorrhoeae, Hemophilus influenzae, Streptococcus pneumoniae, Streptococcus mutans and Helicobacter pylori).  In the case of the pathogenic species that infect humans, it was proposed that RecA-mediated repair of DNA damages may be of substantial benefit when these bacteria are challenged by the oxidative defenses of their host.

References

Bacterial proteins
DNA repair